A referendum was held in Mandatory Iraq between 16 July and 11 August 1921 to determine the form of government and head of state.

Background 

During World War I, the United Kingdom occupied several parts of the Ottoman Empire. Three Mesopotamian vilayets (provinces) including Basra, Baghdad, and Mosul were combined to form Iraq. A group of Iraqi politicians met in Cairo in 1921 and called for a monarchy headed by Faisal bin Hussein. The Iraqi government and British administration approved this decision; and a referendum was held to determine the public approval.

Results

The referendum started on 16 July 1921 and ended on 11 August 1921. The results were announced on 19 August 1921 with 96% of the voters approving Faisal as King.

Aftermath

Faisal was crowned on 23 August 1921. Subsequently, a new Iraqi government was formed by Abdul-Muhsin Al-Saadoun on 20 November 1922, and elections for a constituent assembly were held between 1922 and 1924.

References

Referendums in Iraq
History of Iraq
History of Mesopotamia
Iraq
Monarchy referendums